The South American Coach of the Year is an annual association football award presented to the best coach of a club or national team in South America over the previous calendar year. The award has been presented by Uruguayan newspaper El País since 1986.

The award goes to any coach/manager of a South American club or national team, regardless of the coaches' nationality. Argentine coaches have won the award the most, with 20 wins by 11 different coaches. With five awards, Argentine Carlos Bianchi is the most decorated awardee. The Colombia national team is the side that produced most winners, with 5 in total. The current winner for 2021 is the Portuguese Abel Ferreira, manager of Brazilian side Palmeiras, the first non-South American national to win it.

Winners

Wins by coach

Wins by nationality

Wins by team

References
General

Specific

External links
South American Coach of the Year at RSSSF
El Pais newspaper (Spanish)

Coach
South
Awards by newspapers
Awards established in 1986